Holy Trinity Church is a former Church of England church in Bolventor, Cornwall, England, UK. It was built in 1846–48 and served as the parish church of Bolventor until its closure in 1981. The church has been Grade II listed since 1988.

History
With the formation of Bolventor as a parish in 1846, plans were made for a church capable of accommodating 150 persons. The foundation stone was laid in July 1846 by the church's builder, Francis Rashleigh Rodd of Trebartha Hall and £100 was granted towards its construction by the Exeter Diocesan Church Building Society in 1847. The church, which cost £666 to build, was consecrated by the Bishop of Exeter, Henry Phillpotts, on 7 July 1848.

A restoration of the church was completed in 1965. Due to a decline in congregation numbers, Holy Trinity closed in June 1981. It was later acquired by private owners in 2011, who were granted planning permission that year to transform the former church into a residence. With a partial conversion carried out, the church was sold again in 2018.

References

Church of England church buildings in Cornwall
Redundant churches
Grade II listed churches in Cornwall